The reticulate worm snake (Amerotyphlops reticulatus) is a species of snake in the Typhlopidae family. The snake has been reported in Colombia, Peru, Bolivia, Brazil, the Guyanas and Venezuela.

References

reticulatus
Snakes of South America
Reptiles of Bolivia
Reptiles of Brazil
Reptiles of Colombia
Reptiles of French Guiana
Reptiles of Guyana
Reptiles of Peru
Reptiles of Suriname
Reptiles of Venezuela
Reptiles described in 1758
Taxa named by Carl Linnaeus